National Centre Party may refer to:

 National Centre Party (Estonia)
 National Centre Party (Ireland)